Joel Hynek is a visual effects artist who has worked on over 30 films since 1980.

Recognition

Oscar-nominations in the category of Best Visual Effects

60th Academy Awards-Predator. Nomination shared with Richard Greenberg, Robert M. Greenberg and Stan Winston. Lost to Innerspace.
71st Academy Awards-What Dreams May Come. Shared with Nicholas Brooks, Kevin Mack and Stuart Robertson. Won.
Oscar award in the category of Scientific and Engineering

 1987. Shared with Robert M. Greenberg (R/Greenberg Associates, Inc.), Eugene Mamut (R/Greenberg Associates, Inc.), Alfred Thumim (Oxberry Division of Richmark Camera Service, Inc.), Elan Lipshitz (Oxberry Division of Richmark Camera Service, Inc.), Darryl A. Armour (Oxberry Division of Richmark Camera Service, Inc.) For the design and development of the RGA/Oxberry Compu-Quad Special Effects Optical Printer.

Popular culture 
Joel is portrayed as a child on the History Channel's Project Blue Book show, which depicts the work and research of his father Dr. J. Allen Hynek.

References

External links

Living people
Best Visual Effects Academy Award winners
Special effects people
Year of birth missing (living people)